Ranoidea chloris, commonly known as the red-eyed tree frog or orange-eyed tree frog, is a species of tree frog native to eastern Australia; ranging from south of Sydney (Nowra area) to Proserpine in mid-northern Queensland.

Description

The red-eyed tree frog is a uniform bright green above, occasionally with yellow spots, and bright yellow on the underside. The front sides of the arms and legs are green, while the underside is yellow or white. The thighs may be blue/purple to blue/black in colour in adults. It has golden eyes at the centre, which change to red towards the edge of the eye. The intensity of the eye colour is variable between frogs. The tympanum is visible, and a mature frog reaches a size of 65 mm.

The tadpoles are generally grey or brown, and can have gold pigment along the side.

A similar species, the orange-thighed frog (Litoria xantheroma) is found north of Proserpine and has orange on the back of the thighs.

Ecology and behaviour
This species of frog is associated with rainforests, wet sclerophyll forests, and woodlands. The call is several long, moaning "aaa-rk" sounds, followed by soft trills. Males call and breeding takes place mostly after rain in temporary ponds, roadside ditches, dams, ponds, and creek offshoots where the water is not flowing.

As a pet
It is kept as a pet. In Australia, this animal may be kept in captivity with the appropriate permit.

References

  Database entry includes a range map and a brief justification of why this species is of least concern
Cogger, H.G. 1979. Reptiles & Amphibians of Australia. A. H. & A. W. REED PTY LTD. 
MacMillan, L. 2005. Frog secretions block HIV infections. Exploration, Vanderbilt University
Department of Environment, Climate Change and Water, New South Wales: Amphibian Keeper's Licence: Species Lists

External links

Ranoidea (genus)
Frogs of Australia
Amphibians of Queensland
Amphibians of New South Wales
Amphibians described in 1892
Taxa named by George Albert Boulenger